Cholesterol side-chain cleavage enzyme is commonly referred to as P450scc, where "scc" is an acronym for side-chain cleavage. P450scc is a mitochondrial enzyme that catalyzes conversion of cholesterol to pregnenolone. This is the first reaction in the process of steroidogenesis in all mammalian tissues that specialize in the production of various steroid hormones.

P450scc is a member of the cytochrome P450 superfamily of enzymes (family 11, subfamily A, polypeptide 1) and is encoded by the  gene.

Nomenclature 

The systematic name of this enzyme class is cholesterol, reduced-adrenal-ferredoxin:oxygen oxidoreductase (side-chain-cleaving). Other names include:

 C27-side-chain cleavage enzyme
 cholesterol 20-22-desmolase
 cholesterol C20-22 desmolase
 cholesterol desmolase
 cholesterol side-chain cleavage enzyme
 cholesterol side-chain-cleaving enzyme
 cytochrome P-450scc
 desmolase, steroid 20-22
 enzymes, cholesterol side-chain-cleaving
 steroid 20-22 desmolase
 steroid 20-22-lyase.

Tissue and intracellular localization 
The highest level of the cholesterol side-chain cleavage system is found in the adrenal cortex and the corpus luteum. The system is also expressed at high levels in steroidogenic theca cells in the ovary, and Leydig cells in the testis. During pregnancy, the placenta also expresses significant levels of this enzyme system. P450scc is also present at much lower levels in several other tissue types, including the brain.  In the adrenal cortex, the concentration of adrenodoxin is similar to that of P450scc, but adrenodoxin reductase is expressed at lower levels.

Immunofluorescence studies using specific antibodies against P450scc system enzymes have demonstrated that proteins are located exclusively within the mitochondria. P450scc is associated with the inner mitochondrial membrane, facing the interior (matrix). Adrenodoxin and adrenodoxin reductase are soluble peripheral membrane proteins located inside the mitochondrial matrix that appear to associate with each other primarily through electrostatic interactions.

Mechanism of action 
P450scc catalyzes the conversion of cholesterol to pregnenolone in three monooxygenase reactions. These involve 2 hydroxylations of the cholesterol side-chain, which generate, first, 22R-hydroxycholesterol and then 20alpha,22R-dihydroxycholesterol.  The final step cleaves the bond between carbons 20 and 22, resulting in the production of pregnenolone and isocaproic aldehyde.

Each monooxygenase step requires 2 electrons (reducing equivalents). The initial source of the electrons is NADPH. The electrons are transferred from NADPH to P450scc via two electron transfer proteins: adrenodoxin reductase and adrenodoxin.  All three proteins together constitute the cholesterol side-chain cleavage complex.

The involvement of three proteins in cholesterol side-chain cleavage reaction raises the question of whether the
three proteins function as a ternary complex as reductase:adrenodoxin:P450. Both spectroscopic studies of adrenodoxin binding to P450scc and kinetic studies in the presence of varying concentrations of adrenodoxin reductase demonstrated that the reductase competes with P450scc for binding to adrenodoxin. These results demonstrated that the formation of a functional ternary complex is not possible. From these studies, it was concluded that the binding sites of adrenodoxin to its reductase and to P450 are overlapping and, as a consequence, adrenodoxin functions as a mobile electron shuttle between reductase and P450. These conclusions have been confirmed by structural analysis of adrenodoxin and P450 complex.

The process of electron transfer from NADPH to P450scc is not tightly coupled; that is, during electron transfer from adrenodoxin reductase via adrenodoxin to P450scc, a certain portion of the electrons leak outside of the chain and react with O2, generating superoxide radicals. Steroidogenic cells include a diverse array of antioxidant systems to cope with the radicals generated by the steroidogenic enzymes.

Regulation 
In each steroidogenic cell, the expression of the P450scc system proteins is regulated by the trophic hormonal system specific for the cell type. In adrenal cortex cells from zona fasciculata, the expression of the mRNAs encoding all three P450scc proteins is induced by corticotropin (ACTH). The trophic hormones increase CYP11A1 gene expression through transcription factors such as steroidogenic factor 1 (SF-1), by the α isoform of activating protein 2 (AP-2) in the human, and many others. The production of this enzyme is inhibited notably by the nuclear receptor DAX-1.

P450scc is always active, however its activity is limited by the supply of cholesterol in the inner membrane.  The supplying of cholesterol to this membrane (from the outer mitochondrial membrane) is, thus, considered the true rate-limiting step in steroid production.  This step is mediated primarily by the steroidogenic acute regulatory protein (StAR or STARD1). Upon stimulation of a cell to make steroid, the amount of StAR available to transfer cholesterol to the inner membrane limits how fast the reaction can go (the acute phase).  With prolonged (chronic) stimulation, it is thought that cholesterol supply becomes no longer an issue and that the capacity of the system to make steroid (i.e., level of P450scc in the mitochondria) is now more important.

Corticotropin (ACTH) is a hormone that is released from the anterior pituitary in response to stress situations. A study of the steroidogenic capacity of the adrenal cortex in infants with acute respiratory disease demonstrated that indeed during disease state there is a specific increase in the steroidogenic capacity for the synthesis of the glucocorticoid cortisol but not for the mineralocorticoid aldosterone or androgen DHEAS that are secreted from other zones of the adrenal cortex.

Pathology 
Mutations in the CYP11A1 gene result in a steroid hormone deficiency, causing a minority of cases of the rare and potentially fatal condition lipoid congenital adrenal hyperplasia. Deficiency of CYP11A1 can result in hyperpigmentation, hypoglycemis, and recurrent infections.

Inhibitors
Cholesterol side-chain cleavage enzyme inhibitors include aminoglutethimide, ketoconazole, and mitotane, among others.

See also 
 Steroidogenic enzyme
 Cytochrome P450 oxidase

References

Further reading

Steroid hormone synthesis

Additional images

External links 
 

11
EC 1.14.15